4-Acetoxy-DiPT (4-acetoxy-N,N-diisopropyltryptamine, ipracetin) is a synthetic psychedelic tryptamine. It is relatively uncommon and has only a short history of human use.

Chemistry
4-AcO-DiPT is a tryptamine structurally similar to 4-HO-DiPT and psilocin.

Drug prohibition laws

Denmark
4-AcO-DiPT is added to the list of Schedule B controlled substances.

Japan
4-Acetoxy-DiPT is a controlled substance in Japan.

Sweden
Sveriges riksdags health ministry Statens folkhälsoinstitut classified 4-AcO-DiPT as "health hazard" under the act Lagen om förbud mot vissa hälsofarliga varor (translated Act on the Prohibition of Certain Goods Dangerous to Health) as of Mar 1, 2005,  in their regulation SFS 2005:26 listed as 4-acetoxi-N,N-diisopropyltryptamin (4-AcO-DIPT), making it illegal to sell or possess.

United States
4-Acetoxy-DiPT is an unscheduled substance in the United States. Due to similarities to other scheduled tryptamines such as psilocin and DiPT, possession may be prosecuted under the Federal Analog Act in the United States.

See also
 TiHKAL

References

External links
Erowid 4-Acetoxy-DiPT vault

Acetate esters
Designer drugs
Psychedelic tryptamines
Diisopropylamino compounds